The Keith Green Collection is the fourth album released by American contemporary Christian music pianist and singer Keith Green. It was released on August 11, 1981. This is also the only compilation album to be released during Green's lifetime.

Making of the album
This album was the first album by Green for which he did not partake in the production as he had with all of his previous releases. Bill Maxwell yet again took up the role of producing the album as he had done with all of Green's prior works. The album was made over a span of several months during 1981.

Most of the tracks on The Keith Green Collection were previously released on Green albums. The exceptions— "Rushing Wind", "The Sheep and the Goats", and "Scripture Song Medley" — were recordings of live performances.

Track listing
 "Introduction" - 1:02
 "Rushing Wind" - 3:45
 "You Put This Love In My Heart" - 3:31
 "Grace By Which I Stand" - 4:53
 "You!" - 3:38
 "Your Love Broke Through" - 3:30
 "He'll Take Care Of The Rest" - 4:01
 "Lies" - 3:45
 "The Sheep And The Goats" - 7:51
 "Asleep In The Light" - 4:26
 "Soften Your Heart" - 2:54
 "How Can They Live Without Jesus" - 3:09
 "Scripture Song Medley" - 3:48

References

External links
 Keith Green discography

Keith Green albums
1981 compilation albums